The platelet-activating factor receptor (PAF-R) is a G-protein coupled receptor which binds platelet-activating factor. It is encoded in the human by the PTAFR gene.

The PAF receptor shows structural characteristics of the rhodopsin (MIM 180380) gene family and binds platelet-activating factor (PAF). PAF is a phospholipid (1-0-alkyl-2-acetyl-sn-glycero-3-phosphorylcholine) that has been implicated as a mediator in diverse pathologic processes, such as allergy, asthma, septic shock, arterial thrombosis, and inflammatory processes.[supplied by OMIM] Its pathogenetic role in chronic kidney failure has also been reported recently.

Ligands
Agonists
 Platelet activating factor

Antagonists
 Apafant (WEB-2086)
 Israpafant (Y-24180)
 Lexipafant
 Rupatadine

References

Further reading

External links

 

G protein-coupled receptors